The 1954 NCAA Skiing Championships were contested at the first annual NCAA-sanctioned ski tournament to determine the individual and team national champions of men's collegiate alpine and cross-country skiing in the United States. This championships were held March 4–7 at Slide Mountain outside Reno, Nevada, hosted by the University of Nevada.

Denver finished ahead of Seattle to claim the team championship; the Pioneers were coached by Willy Schaeffler. Nevada senior Pat Myers won the downhill, edging out Olympian Darrell Robison of Utah.

Team scoring

(H) = Hosts
Teams declared ineligible were Western State and Whitman.

Individual events
Four events were held, which yielded five individual titles.
Thursday: Cross Country
Friday: Downhill
Saturday: Slalom
Sunday: Jumping

References

NCAA Skiing Championships
1954 in sports in Nevada
1954 in American sports
1954 in alpine skiing
1954 in cross-country skiing
1954 in ski jumping
Skiing in Nevada